Morning Call may refer to:
 A morning bugle call or trumpet call, used in the U.S. military
 A wake-up call
 Morning Call (CNBC), a U.S. business-news television series on CNBC 
 Morning Call (film), a 1957 British thriller film
 Morning Call, a band signed to Drive-Thru Records
 Morning Call Coffee Stand, a coffeehouse in New Orleans, Louisiana, U.S.
 The Morning Call, a newspaper in Allentown, Pennsylvania, United States